Sexual harassment is a form of intimidation or coercion of a sexual nature.

Sexual Harassment may also refer to:
 Sexual Harassment (album), a 2012 album by Norwegian band Turbonegro
 "Sexual Harassment" (The Office), an episode of The Office
 "Sexual Harassment" (Beavis and Butt-head episode)
 Sexual Harassment (musical act), known for their 1980's hit I Need a Freak.
 Sexual Harassment in the Workplace, a track on Frank Zappa's album Guitar

See also 
 My Sexual Harassment, yaoi anime